White Shoal Light can refer to a lighthouse in the United States:

 White Shoal Light, Michigan west of Mackinaw City
 White Shoal Light, Virginia in the James River near Newport News